Dexagria ushinskyi is a species of true flies in the family Sarcophagidae.

Range
Turkmenistan.

References 

Sarcophagidae
Diptera of Asia
Insects described in 1978